The 2022 California's 22nd congressional district special election took place on June 7, 2022, with the primary election on April 5, 2022. California's 22nd congressional district became vacant when Republican representative Devin Nunes resigned on January 1, 2022, to become the CEO of the Trump Media & Technology Group.

Governor Gavin Newsom scheduled the special election for June 7, 2022, with the primary election on April 5, 2022. The election was held using a nonpartisan blanket primary, a system where all candidates ran in the same primary, and if no candidate receives a majority of votes, the top-two candidates then advance to the general election. No candidate received a majority in the primary, so Republican Connie Conway and Democrat Lourin Hubbard advanced to the runoff.

Nonpartisan blanket primary

Candidates

Advanced to general election
Connie Conway (Republican), former Minority Leader of the California State Assembly and small business owner
Lourin Hubbard (Democratic), operations manager at the California Department of Water Resources

Eliminated in primary
Eric Garcia (Democratic), U.S. Marine Corps veteran, therapist and independent candidate for this district in 2020
Michael Maher (Republican), aviation business owner
Matt Stoll (Republican), small business owner

Disqualified
John Estrada (Republican), businessman and perennial candidate
Noah Junio (American Independent Party)

Withdrawn
 Phil Arballo (Democratic), financial advisor and candidate for this district in 2020
 Andreas Borgeas (Republican), state senator from the 8th district
 Nathan Magsig (Republican), Fresno County supervisor

Declined
 Mike Boudreaux (Republican), Tulare County sheriff (endorsed Magsig)
 Steve Brandau (Republican), Fresno County supervisor
 Luis Chavez (Democratic), Fresno city councilor
 Jerry Dyer (Republican), mayor of Fresno
 Shannon Grove (Republican), state senator from the 16th district and former Minority Leader of the California Senate (running for re-election)
 Melissa Hurtado (Democratic), state senator from the 14th district (running for re-election)
 Devon Mathis (Republican), state assemblyman from the 26th district (running for re-election)
 Margaret Mims (Republican), Fresno County sheriff
 Jim Patterson (Republican), state assemblyman from the 23rd district (running for re-election; endorsed Magsig)
 Lisa Smittcamp (Republican), Fresno County District Attorney
 Pete Vander Poel III (Republican), Tulare County supervisor
 Tim Ward (Republican), Tulare County District Attorney
 Bob Whalen (Republican), Clovis city councilor

Endorsements

Predictions

Results

General election

Endorsements

Predictions

Results

See also
2022 United States House of Representatives elections
2022 United States elections
117th United States Congress
List of special elections to the United States House of Representatives

References

External links
Official campaign websites
Connie Conway (R) for Congress
Eric Garcia (D) for Congress
Elizabeth Heng (R) for Congress 
Lourin Hubbard (D) for Congress
Michael Maher (R) for Congress
Matt Stoll (R) for Congress

California 2022 22
California 2022 22
2022 22 Special
California 22 Special
United States House of Representatives 22 Special
United States House of Representatives 2022 22